Please don't delete this article because this actor or actress will play a lead or supporting role in the tokusatsu series "Uchu Sentai Kyuranger"  and will continue their career and make more roles, either lead or supporting, after the end of the programme.

 is a Japanese actor, singer and tarento. He is currently employed by Imagene.

Biography
In 2010 Yamazaki competed in the 23rd Junon Super Boy Contest. During the final examination performance held in November he sang L'Arc-en-Ciel's "Caress of Venus", and won the Special Jury Prize.
In March 2011 Yamazaki announced that he is affiliated with Itoh Company.
In May 2012 he formed the cheering squad Tower Boys at Tokyo Tower along with Yuta Higuchi and Daisuke Iku, who share the same office as him. Throughout 2012 and 2013 the group performed a variety of events monthly at the tower.
Yamazaki's first leading role in stage was the Initial Film play Anata ni okuru Kiss 2 (performed from 9 to 13 July 2014 at Roppongi Actor's Theater).
On 10 June 2015 London Kage Kitan Sherlock Holmes lead actor Yuta Higuchi announced that he stepped down due to his poor physical condition. As a result, it was announced that Yamazaki will become his understudy. There was also a change on the 14 where he had to play the role of Wiggins for two days.

Filmography

TV drama

TV programmes

Films

Magazines

Radio

Video games

Events

Others

References

External links
 
 
 

21st-century Japanese male actors
Actors from Shizuoka Prefecture
1995 births
Japanese Roman Catholics
Living people